From a historical perspective, Professor Ishtiaq Ahmed of the University of Stockholm and Professor Shamsul Islam of the University of Delhi classified the Muslims of South Asia into two categories during the era of the Indian independence movement: nationalist Muslims (individuals who opposed the partition of India) and Muslim nationalists (individuals who desired to create a separate country for Indian Muslims). The All India Azad Muslim Conference represented nationalist Muslims, while the All-India Muslim League represented the Muslim nationalists. One such popular debate was the Madani–Iqbal debate.

Historical foundations

During the Delhi Sultanate era, the Muslim kingdoms were among powerful military groups in India, and an Islamic society that descended from the Middle East and Central Asia and from areas which became modern day Afghanistan spread the religion amongst Indians. The Mughal Empire, especially under the reign of Emperor Aurangzeb, witnessed the full establishment of sharia.

Ideological foundations

The first organized expressions began with Muslim scholars and reformers like Syed Ahmed Khan, Syed Ameer Ali and the Aga Khan who had an influential major hand in the Indian independence movement.

Expression of Muslim separatism and nationhood emerged from modern Islam's pre-eminent poet and philosopher, Sir Allama Muhammad Iqbal and political activists like Choudhary Rahmat Ali.

In politics

Some prominent Muslims politically sought a base for themselves, separate from Hindus and other Indian nationalists, who espoused the Indian National Congress. Muslim scholars, religious leaders and politicians founded the All India Muslim League in 1906.

Muslims comprised 25% of pre-independence India's collective population (British India including princely states). Some Muslim leaders felt that their cultural and economic contributions to India's heritage and life merited a significant role for Muslims in a future independent India's governance and politics.

A movement led by Allama Iqbal and ultimately Muhammad Ali Jinnah, who originally fought for Muslim rights within India, later felt a separate homeland must be obtained for India's Muslims in order to achieve prosperity. They espoused the Two-Nation Theory, that India was in fact home to the Muslim and Hindu nations, who were distinct in every way.

The Deobandi strain of Islamic theology also advocated a notion of composite nationalism in which Hindus and Muslims were seen as one nation united in the struggle against British colonial rule in undivided India. In 1919, a large group of Deobandi scholars formed the political party Jamiat Ulema-e-Hind and it maintained a position of opposing the partition of India. Deobandi Islamic scholar Maulana Syed Husain Ahmad Madani helped to spread these ideas through his text Muttahida Qaumiyat Aur Islam.

Muslim separatism and partition of India 

Muhammad Ali Jinnah led the Muslim League's call for Pakistan. As time went on, communal tensions rose and so partition won increasing support among many Muslims in Muslim-majority areas of the British India.

On 14 August 1947, Pakistan was created out of the Muslim majority provinces of British India, Sindh, the west of Punjab, Balochistan and the North West Frontier Province, and in formerly in the east with Bengal. Communal violence broke out and millions of people were forced to flee their homes and many died. Hindus and Sikhs fled from Pakistan to India and Muslims fled from India to Pakistan.

However, because Muslim communities existed throughout the South Asia, independence actually left tens of millions of Muslims within the boundaries of the secular Indian state. As per 2011 Census, approximately 14.2% of the population of India is Muslim.

The Muslim League idea of a Muslim Nationalism encompassing all the Muslims of the Indian subcontinent seemed to lose out to ethnic nationalism in 1971, when East Pakistan, a Bengali dominated province, fought for their independence from Pakistan, and became the independent country of Bangladesh.

Pakistani nationalism

Pakistani nationalism refers to the political, cultural, linguistic, historical, religious and geographical expression of patriotism by the people of Pakistan, of pride in the history, culture, identity, heritage and religious identity of Pakistan, and visions for its future.
Pakistan nationalism is the direct outcome of Muslim nationalism, which emerged in India in the 19th century. Its intellectual pioneer was Sir Syed Ahmad Khan.
Unlike the secular nationalism of other countries, Pakistani nationalism and the religion of Islam are not mutually exclusive and religion is a part of the Pakistani nationalist narrative. During the late years of British rule and leading up to independence, it had three distinct supporters:

 Idealists, such as majority of Muslim students and intellectuals, inspired by the Aligarh Movement and Allama Iqbal, driven by a fear of being engulfed in "false secularism" that would assimilate their beliefs, culture and heritage and Islamic ideology into a common system that defied Islamic civic tenets and ideals while hoping to create a state where their higher education, reformist Islamist ideology and wealth would keep them in power over the other Muslims of India.
 Realists, driven by political inflexibility demonstrated by the Indian National Congress, feared a systematic disenfranchisement of Muslims. This also included many members of the Parsi, and Nizari Ismaili communities.
 Traditionalists, primarily lower Orthodoxy (Barelvi), that feared the dominative power of the upper Orthodoxy (Deoband) and saw Pakistan as a safe haven to prevent their domination by State-controlled propaganda. Although many upper Orthodoxy (such as Shabbir Ahmad Usmani and Ashraf Ali Thanwi) also supported the state in the interests of an Islamic Republic.

Muslim nationalism in India
According to official government statistics, the Hindu-majority India has almost 14% Muslim population  spread across all states with significant concentrations in Uttar Pradesh, Bihar, Telangana,   Assam, West Bengal, Gujarat, Kerala and Jammu and Kashmir. It is the third-largest home to Muslims after Indonesia and Pakistan and the second-largest home to Shia Muslims.

Since independence, there has been a great deal of conflict within the various Muslim communities as to how to best function within the complex political and cultural mosaic that defines Indian politics in India today.

All in all, Muslim perseverance in sustaining their continued advancement along with Government efforts to focus on Pakistan as the primary problem for Indian Muslims in achieving true minority rights has created a sometimes extreme support for Indian nationalism, giving the Indian State much-needed credibility in projecting a strong secular image throughout the rest of the world.

The Jamiat Ulema-e-Hind, a leading Indian Islamic organization has propounded a theological basis for Indian Muslims' nationalistic philosophy. Their thesis is that Muslims and non-Muslims have entered upon a mutual contract in India since independence, to establish a secular state. The Constitution of India represents this contract. This is known in Urdu as a mu'ahadah. Accordingly, as the Muslim community's elected representatives supported and swore allegiance to this mu'ahadah so the specific duty of Muslims is to keep loyalty to the Constitution. This mu'ahadah is similar to a previous similar contract signed between the Muslims and the Jews in Medina.

South Asian Muslim leaders
Reformers
Syed Ahmad Khan, Maulana Mohammad Ali, Maulana Shaukat Ali, Nawabs of Bhopal

Freedom Fighters (primarily against the British)
Badruddin Tyabji, Mukhtar Ahmed Ansari, Maulana Azad, Saifuddin Kitchlew, Maghfoor Ahmad Ajazi, Hakim Ajmal Khan, Abbas Tyabji, Rafi Ahmed Kidwai, Maulana Mehmud Hasan, Khan Abdul Gaffar Khan, Hussain Ahmad Madani .

Pakistan Movement
Muhammad Ali Jinnah, Allama Iqbal, Liaquat Ali Khan, Abdur Rab Nishtar, Huseyn Shaheed Suhrawardy, A.K. Fazlul Huq, Begum Jahanara Shahnawaz, Syed Ahmed Khan, Shamsul Haque Faridpuri .

Religious
Qazi Syed Rafi Mohammad, Maulana Syed Maudoodi, Ahmad Raza Khan, Mohammad Abdul Ghafoor Hazarvi, Ashraf Ali Thanvi .

See also

Madani–Iqbal debate
 Arrow of a Blue-Skinned God by Jonah Blank
 Patel: A Life by Rajmohan Gandhi
 India and Pakistan in War and Peace by J.N. Dixit

References

 
Politics of India
Pakistan Movement
Indian independence movement
Nationalism in India
Islam in Pakistan
Islam in India
Islamic nationalism
Pakistani nationalism
Islam in South Asia